Mary E. Wilson is a Canadian politician, who was elected to the Legislative Assembly of New Brunswick in the 2018 election. She represents the electoral district of Oromocto-Lincoln-Fredericton as a member of the Progressive Conservative Party of New Brunswick.

Wilson is a Minister in the Higgs government and was re-elected in the 2020 provincial election.

Election results

References

Living people
Progressive Conservative Party of New Brunswick MLAs
Women MLAs in New Brunswick
21st-century Canadian politicians
21st-century Canadian women politicians
Members of the Executive Council of New Brunswick
Women government ministers of Canada
Year of birth missing (living people)